Arnold "Arne" Glimcher (born March 12, 1938) is an American art dealer, gallerist, film producer, and film director. He is the founder of The Pace Gallery. Glimcher has produced and directed several films, including The Mambo Kings and Just Cause. He is the father of art dealer Marc Glimcher and American scientist Paul Glimcher.

Early life and education
Glimcher was born on March 12, 1938, in Duluth, Minnesota, and raised in Boston. He was the youngest of four and spent a lot of his spare time alone, drawing and painting. He later graduated from Massachusetts College of Art and Design, and Boston University.

Career

In the art market
In 1960, Glimcher founded the Pace Gallery in Boston. In 1963, he moved the gallery to New York City. In 1980, he sold Jasper Johns's Three Flags to the Whitney Museum of American Art for $1 million, the first time a work by a living artist had ever commanded seven figures.

Today, the Pace Gallery represents contemporary artists including Chuck Close, Tara Donovan, David Hockney, Maya Lin and Kiki Smith. It also represents the estates of several artists, including Pablo Picasso, Agnes Martin, Ad Reinhardt, and Alexander Calder. Glimcher is chairman of the Pace Gallery. During his career he has worked closely with important artists, including Jean Dubuffet, Robert Rauschenberg, Louise Nevelson, and Lucas Samaras.

In 2007, Glimcher received the Distinguished Alumni Award from the Massachusetts College of Art and Design.

In film
Glimcher made his feature-film debut in a small role in Robert Benton's 1982 film Still of the Night.  He later served as an associate producer for Ivan Reitman's 1986 film Legal Eagles and went on to produce Gorillas in the Mist, and The Good Mother, both released in 1988.

Glimcher made his directorial debut with the 1992 film The Mambo Kings. The film, based on Oscar Hijuelos' book The Mambo Kings Play Songs of Love, received widespread critical acclaim.  Glimcher received an Academy Award Best Original Song nomination for the film's original song, Beautiful Maria of My Soul, which was also nominated for a Golden Globe Award in the same category.

Glimcher later directed the 1995 film Just Cause starring Sean Connery and Laurence Fishburne to a more mixed reception.  In 1999, Glimcher directed The White River Kid which featured an ensemble cast, including Antonio Banderas from The Mambo Kings.

In 2008, he produced and directed the documentary film Picasso and Braque Go to the Movies.

Personal life
Glimcher is married to Milly Cooper. They maintain residences in New York's Upper East Side and East Hampton, where their holiday home was designed by Ulrich Franzen in 1983.

References

External links
 
 Cubism as Film Adaptation, The Wall Street Journal, 27 May 2010
Oral history interview with Arne (Arnold) Glimcher, 2010 Jan. 6-25, Archives of American Art, Smithsonian Institution

1938 births
American art dealers
People from Duluth, Minnesota
Massachusetts College of Art and Design alumni
Boston University alumni
Living people
Film directors from Minnesota
Film producers from Minnesota